"Lift" is a song by the Finnish rock band Poets of the Fall. It is the second single released from their debut album, Signs of Life. The song was released in Finland on 9 September 2004. The song reached #8 on the Finnish Top 40 and stayed there for 11 consecutive weeks. It contains two versions of the title track, as well as the B-side, The Beautiful Ones.

Markus Kaarlonen produced a dance remix of the song, entitled Lift (Dramadance Remix). It is only available for download (as an MP3 or WAV file) on a secret page of the band's official website which can be accessed by the special login and password from the Signs of Life album booklet.

Track listing
"Lift" (radio edit) - 4:01
"Lift" (album version) - 5:13
"The Beautiful Ones" - 5:22

Nominations

Music video
The promotional video for "Lift" was released on August 8, 2005. It can be watched online on the band's official website.

References

Poets of the Fall songs
2004 singles
2004 songs